Pseudo-Plutarch is the conventional name given to the actual, but unknown, authors of a number of pseudepigrapha (falsely attributed works) attributed to Plutarch but now known to have not been written by him.

Some of these works were included in some editions of Plutarch's Moralia. Among these are: 
the Lives of the Ten Orators (Latin: Vitae decem oratorum), biographies of the Ten Orators of ancient Athens, based on Caecilius of Calacte, possibly deriving from a common source with the Lives of Photius
The Doctrines of the Philosophers (Latin: Placita Philosophorum)
De Musica (On Music)
Parallela Minora (Minor Parallels)
Pro Nobilitate (Noble Lineage)
De Fluviorum et Montium Nominibus (About the Names of Rivers and Mountains/On Rivers; Greek: Περὶ ποταμῶν καὶ ὀρῶν ἐπωνυμίας)
De Homero (On Homer)
De Unius in Re Publica Dominatione (On the Rule of One in the Republic)
Consolatio ad Apollonium (Consolation to Apollonius)

These works date to slightly later than Plutarch, but almost all of them date to Late Antiquity (3rd to 4th century AD). D. Blank has recently shown that Pro Nobilitate was written by Arnoul Le Ferron (Arnoldus Ferronus) and first published in 1556.

One pseudepigraphal philosophical work, De Fato (On Fate; included in editions of Plutarch's Moralia), is thought to be a 2nd-century Middle Platonic work.

Stromateis (Στρωματεῖς, "Patchwork"), an important source for pre-Socratic philosophy, is also falsely ascribed to Plutarch.

Some works ascribed to Plutarch are likely of medieval origin, such as the "Letter to Trajan."

References

Sources
Aalders G. J. D. "Plutarch or Pseudo-Plutarch? The authorship of De unius in re publica dominatione" Mnemosyne XXXV (1982):72-83.
Boscherini, S. 1985 "A proposito della tradizione del Pro nobilitate pseudo-plutarcheo" in R. Cardini, E. Garin, L. C. Martinelli, G. Pascucci, eds., Tradizione classica e letteratura umanistica. Per Alessandro Perosa. Vol.I. II. (Humanistica.3.4.). (Roma): 651-660.
Conti Bizzarro, Ferruccio "Note a Ps.-Plutarch. de musica" MCr 29 (1994): 259-261.
Hillgruber, Michael 1994 Die pseudoplutarchische Schrift De Homero. (Stuttgart).
Jurado, E.A. Ramos "Quaestiones ps.-Plutarcheae" in Pérez Jimenez 1990:123-126.
Seeliger, Friedrich Konrad 1874 De Dionysio Halicarnassensi Plutarchi qui vulgo fertur in vitis decem oratorum auctore. Dissertation—Leipzig. (Budissae).
Smith, Rebekah M. 1992 "Photius on the ten orators" GRBS 33: 59-189.
Tieleman, Teun 1991 "Diogenes of Babylon and Stoic embryology: Ps. Plutarch, Plac. V 15.4 reconsidered." Mnemosyne 44:106-125.

External links
 Bibliography on Plutarch
 Complete text of the Placita: Greek and French, English and French

Ancient Greek pseudepigrapha
Latin pseudepigrapha
Plutarch
Unidentified people